Antispila ampelopsia is a moth of the family Heliozelidae. It was described by Kuroko in 1961. It is found in Japan (Kyushu and Yakushima).

The wingspan is 4.5-5.5 mm. The forewings are dark bronzy-fuscous with reddish reflections. The basal area is shining leaden-bronze. The markings are silvery metallic, with yellowish or bluish reflections. The hindwings are fuscous with feeble purplish lusters. Adults appear in mid August, mid September and at the end of June. There are two to three generations per year.

The larvae feed on Ampelopsis glandulosa and Vitis flexuosa. They mine the leaves of their host plant. The mine has the form of a full depth blotch mine. It is semitransparent, whitish and faintly tinged with yellowish green. The feeding area is 74–120 mm long and usually extends to the apical area or marginal area of the leaf. One mine is made on a single leaf. The frass is blackish and is deposited in grains which are scattered in a zigzag line. The larvae create a case which is cut out from the end of the mine. Larvae are found at the end of July, mid August and from the end of September to mid October.

References

Moths described in 1961
Heliozelidae
Moths of Japan